Miles Christi or Milites Christi (Latin for Soldier of Christ) may refer to:
 Soldiers of the Crusades
 Miles Christi (Religious Order), a multinational Catholic religious order founded in Argentina in 1994
 Miles Christianus ideal/allegory
 Members of the Iona Community
 Knights of the Order of Dobrzyń

See also
 Christian soldier (disambiguation)